William Corveysor (fl. 1386), was an English politician.

He was a Member (MP) of the Parliament of England for New Shoreham in 1386.

References

Year of birth missing
Year of death missing
English MPs 1386
14th-century English politicians
People from Shoreham-by-Sea